Jonathan Harris (1914–2002) was an American stage & television actor.

Jonathan or Jon Harris may also refer to:

Entertainment
 Jon Harris (artist) (born 1943), English artist, illustrator, and calligrapher
 Jon Harris (film editor) (born 1967), film editor and director
 Jonathan Calt Harris (born 1969), American conservative writer and editor
 Jonathan Harris (artist) (born 1979), internet artist and designer
 Jonny Harris (born 1975), Canadian actor and comedian
 Jonathan Harris, a character in A, B, C... Manhattan
 Jonathan Harris, a character in Against All Flags
 Jonathan Harris, a recurring character in productions by Mischief Theatre.

Sports
 Jon Harris (American football) (born 1974), former American football defensive end
 Jonathan Harris (American football) (born 1996), American football defensive end
 Jon Harris (basketball) (born 1981), American college basketball coach
 Jon Harris (baseball) (born 1993), baseball player
 Jonathan Harris (sailor) (born 1955), Australian Paralympic sailor

Other
 Jonathan Harris (politician) (born 1964), American politician
 Jonathan Harris (barrister), British barrister and legal scholar
 Jonathan Harris (historian), professor of history at Royal Holloway, University of London
 Jonathan Harris (chartered surveyor) (born 1941), British chartered surveyor

See also
John Harris (disambiguation)